Castle Mountain is a  mountain summit located in Pierce County of Washington state. It is set on the boundary of Norse Peak Wilderness, on land managed by Mount Baker-Snoqualmie National Forest. The Pacific Crest Trail traverses the east slope of Castle's Southeast Peak. Precipitation runoff from Castle Mountain drains into tributaries of the White River.

Climate
Castle Mountain is located in the marine west coast climate zone of western North America. Most weather fronts originate in the Pacific Ocean, and travel northeast toward the Cascade Mountains. As fronts approach, they are forced upward by the peaks of the Cascade Range (Orographic lift), causing them to drop their moisture in the form of rain or snowfall onto the Cascades. As a result, the west side of the Cascades experiences high precipitation, especially during the winter months in the form of snowfall. Because of maritime influence, snow tends to be wet and heavy, resulting in high avalanche danger. During winter months, weather is usually cloudy, but, due to high pressure systems over the Pacific Ocean that intensify during summer months, there is often little or no cloud cover during the summer. The months July through September offer the most favorable weather for viewing or climbing this peak.

See also

 Geology of the Pacific Northwest

References

External links
 Weather forecast: Castle Mountain

Cascade Range
Mountains of Pierce County, Washington
Mountains of Washington (state)
North American 2000 m summits